Anil Kalavampara Narendran (born 5 May 1967) is the judge of Kerala High Court. The High Court of Kerala is the highest court in the Indian state of Kerala and in the Union Territory of Lakshadweep. The High Court of Kerala is headquartered at Ernakulam, Kochi.

Education and career
Anil graduated in chemistry from Sacred Heart College, Thevara, obtained a law degree from Kerala Law Academy and started practice in 1993. He was appointed as additional judge of the High Court of Kerala on 23.01.2014 and became permanent from 10 March 2016. He was one among the sitting judges who were appointed as adjunct professors at National University of Advanced Legal Studies.

References

External links
 High Court of Kerala

Living people
Judges of the Kerala High Court
21st-century Indian judges
1967 births